The Short Admiralty Type 81 was a series of British two-seat floatplanes built prior to the First World War, and used by the Royal Naval Air Service in the early years of the war.  They were powered by  Gnome Lambda-Lambda 14 cylinder two-row rotary engines and had folding wings to aid storage on ship, hence the popular name Short Folder, shared with a number of other seaplanes made by Short Brothers.

Design and development
During 1913, Short Brothers received orders for two new types of floatplanes for the British Royal Naval Air Service (RNAS), a two-bay biplane powered by a  Gnome Lambda-Lambda twin-row rotary engine, of which two were ordered, and a lighter and less powerful three-bay biplane powered by a  Gnome Omega-Omega, (the Short Admiralty Type 74) of which seven were ordered.

The first of these to appear was the 160 hp Gnome-powered aircraft, the first of which had the Shorts construction number S.63 and the Royal Navy serial number 81, making its maiden flight in July 1913, piloted by Charles Rumney Samson. It had high aspect ratio wings of uneven span, which were fitted with large ailerons on the upper wings, and folded for storage on board ship. The second 160 hp Folder, serial number 82, followed in March 1914, and was followed by two more (89 and 90 with three-bay wings and an improved wing-folding mechanism as tested by the Short S.41. The twin-row Gnomes proved to be unreliable, and were fitted with a large funnel-type exhaust stack above the cowling.

Operational history
The RNAS took delivery of 81 on 17 July 1913, and it was quickly deployed aboard the cruiser HMS Hermes, which had been converted to the first seaplane tender of the Royal Navy, for the 1913 Naval manoeuvres, where it was used for reconnaissance missions, using a radio set to report the position of shipping. An engine failure on 1 August resulted in 81 ditching about 50 miles from Great Yarmouth, but although damaged, it was rescued by the German timber carrier Clara Mennig. The second aircraft 82 took place in the unsuccessful search for the missing submarine HMS A7, while four 160 hp Folders took part in the Spithead Fleet Review in July 1914.

The RNAS took delivery of the Sopwith Special floatplane which was specifically designed to drop a 14-inch torpedo in early July 1914, but it proved unable to take off while carrying the planned weapon (or initially at all), so Squadron-Commander Arthur Longmore, commander of the Calshot seaplane station which was carrying out the torpedo trials, suggested that one of the 160 hp Folders be modified for torpedo dropping. Drawings for torpedo gear were quickly produced by Shorts, and aircraft No. 121, flown by Longmore, carried out the first torpedo drop by a British aircraft on 28 July 1914.  Although several other 160 hp Folders were fitted with torpedo gear, the modification was of little practical use, as when carrying a torpedo, it could not carry an observer, and even with only 30 minutes fuel, was badly overloaded.

Following the outbreak of the First World War in August 1914, the Royal Navy purchased three fast cross-channel ferrys for use as seaplane carriers, one of which was HMS Engadine, to which three 160 hp folders were allocated.  When Engadine took part in the Cuxhaven Raid on Christmas Day 1914, two of her Folders took off as part of the strike force, one returning to Engadine, and the other ditching near the Royal Navy submarine E11, which recovered its crew.

Three 160 hp folders were sent to Durban in March 1915 to take part in operations against the German cruiser Königsberg, blockaded in the Ruji Delta in German East Africa.  The Shorts struggled in the hot and humid conditions of East Africa, being unable to carry any bombload, but were used to carry out reconnaissance of the Königsberg before being replaced in June that year by a Caudron G.III and two Farman F.27s.

Specifications (RNAS 119–122, 186)

Notes

References

Barnes, C.H. Shorts Aircraft since 1900. London:Putnam, 1967.
Bruce, J.M. British Aeroplanes 1914–18. London:Putnam, 1957.
Bruce, J.M. "The Short Seaplanes: Historic Military Aircraft No. 14: Part I". Flight, 14 December 1956, pp. 921–926.
Bruce, J.M. "The Short Seaplanes: Historic Military Aircraft No. 14: Part 2". Flight, 21 December 1956, pp. 965–968.
Bruce, J.M. "The Short Seaplanes: Historic Military Aircraft No. 14 Part 4". Flight, 4 January 1957. pp. 23–24.
Mason, Francis K. The British Bomber since 1914. London:Putnam, 1994. .

1910s British military reconnaissance aircraft
Floatplanes
Admiralty Type 81
Biplanes
Rotary-engined aircraft
Single-engined tractor aircraft
Aircraft first flown in 1913